The Apple IIc, the fourth model in the Apple II series of personal computers, is Apple Computer's first endeavor to produce a portable computer. The result was a  notebook-sized version of the Apple II that could be transported from place to place — a portable alternative and complement to the Apple IIe. The c in the name stood for compact, referring to the fact it was essentially a complete Apple II computer setup (minus display and power supply) squeezed into a small notebook-sized housing. While sporting a built-in floppy drive and new rear peripheral expansion ports integrated onto the main logic board, it lacks the internal expansion slots and direct motherboard access of earlier Apple II models, making it a closed system like the Macintosh. However, that was the intended direction for this model — a more appliance-like machine, ready to use out of the box, requiring no technical know-how or experience to hook up and therefore attractive to first-time users.

History
The Apple IIc was released on April 24, 1984, during an Apple-held event called Apple II Forever. With that motto, Apple proclaimed the new machine was proof of the company's long-term commitment to the Apple II series and its users, despite the recent introduction of the Macintosh. The IIc was also seen as the company's response to the new IBM PCjr, and Apple hoped to sell 400,000 by the end of 1984. While essentially an Apple IIe computer in a smaller case, it was not a successor, but rather a portable version to complement it. One Apple II machine would be sold for users who required the expandability of slots, and another for those wanting the simplicity of a plug and play machine with portability in mind.

The machine introduced Apple's Snow White design language, notable for its case styling and a modern look designed by Hartmut Esslinger which became the standard for Apple equipment and computers for nearly a decade. The Apple IIc introduced a unique off-white coloring known as "Fog", chosen to enhance the Snow White design style. The IIc and some peripherals were the only Apple products to use the "Fog" coloring. While relatively light-weight and compact in design, the Apple IIc was not a true portable in design as it lacked a built-in battery and display.

Codenames for the machine while under development included Lollie, ET, Yoda, Teddy, VLC, IIb, IIp.

Overview of features

Improving the IIe
Technically the Apple IIc was an Apple IIe in a smaller case, more portable and easier to use but also less expandable. The IIc used the CMOS-based 65C02 microprocessor which added 27 new instructions to the 6502, but was incompatible with programs that used deprecated illegal opcodes of the 6502. (Apple stated that the Apple IIc was compatible with 90–95% of the 10,000 software packages available for the Apple II series.) The new ROM firmware allowed Applesoft BASIC to recognize lowercase characters and work better with an 80-column display, and fixed several bugs from the IIe ROM. In terms of video, the text display added 32 unique character symbols called "MouseText" which, when placed side by side, could display simple icons, windows and menus to create a graphical user interface completely out of text, similar in concept to IBM code page 437 or PETSCII's box-drawing characters. A year later, the Apple IIe would benefit from these improvements in the form of a four-chip upgrade called the Enhanced IIe.

Built-in cards and ports
The equivalent of five expansion cards were built-in and integrated into the Apple IIc motherboard:  An Extended 80 Column Card, two Apple Super Serial Cards, a Mouse Card, and a disk floppy drive controller card. This meant the Apple IIc had 128 KB RAM, 80-column text, and Double-Hi-Resolution graphics built-in and available right out of the box, unlike its older sibling, the Apple IIe. It also meant less of a need for slots, as the most popular peripheral add-on cards were already built-in, ready for devices to be plugged into the rear ports of the machine. The built-in cards were mapped to phantom slots so software from slot-based Apple II models would know where to find them (i.e. mouse to virtual slot 4, serial cards to slot 1 and 2, floppy to slot 6, and so on). The entire Apple Disk II Card, used for controlling floppy drives, had been shrunk down into a single chip called the "IWM" which stood for Integrated Woz Machine.

In the rear of the machine were its expansion ports, mostly for providing access to its built-in cards. The standard DE-9 joystick connector doubled as a mouse interface, compatible with the same mice used by the Lisa and early Macintosh computers. Two serial ports were provided primarily to support a printer and modem, and a floppy port connector supported a single external 5.25-inch drive (and later "intelligent" devices such as 3.5-inch drives and hard disks). A Video Expansion port provided rudimentary signals for add-on adapters but, alone, could not directly generate a video signal (Apple produced an LCD and an RF-modulator for this port; the latter shipped with early IIcs). A port connector tied into an internal 12 V power converter for attaching batteries; this is where the infamous external power supply (dubbed "brick on a leash" by users) that was included plugged in. The same composite video port found on earlier Apple II models remained present; however, gone were the cassette ports and internal DIP-16 game port.

Built-in accessories and keyboard
The Apple IIc had a built-in 5.25-inch floppy drive (140 KB) along the right side of the case—the first Apple II model to include such a feature. Along the left side of the case was a dial to control the volume of the internal speaker, along with a -inch monaural audio jack for headphones or an external speaker. A fold-out carrying handle doubled as a way to prop up the back end of the machine to angle the keyboard for typing, if desired.

The keyboard layout mirrored that of the Apple IIe; however, the "Reset" key had been moved above the "Esc" key. Two toggle switches were also located in the same area: an "80/40"-column switch for (specially written) software to detect which text video mode to start up in, and a "Keyboard" switch to select between QWERTY and Dvorak layout—or between US and national layout on non-American machines. The keyboard itself was built into the front half of the case, much like a notebook computer, and early models had a rubber mat placed beneath the keycaps which acted as a liquid spill guard.

Reception
Although Apple predicted that it would sell 100,000 IIc computers per month, it sold an average of 100,000 per year over four years; even the unsuccessful PCjr outsold it during each computer's first year on the market. The IIe was much more popular than the IIc because of its greater expandability, but Apple almost stopped production of the IIe because of the IIc's expected popularity, causing a shortage of the former and glut of the latter.

While noting its lack of an internal modem and inability to use expansion cards such as the popular Z-80 SoftCard, BYTE in May 1984 described the Apple IIc as a "head-to-head [competitor] with the IBM PCjr" for novice computer users. Creative Computing agreed, stating in July 1984 that "This war will have no clear winner. Apple fans will buy the IIc, and IBM fans will buy the PCjr. I believe the Apple II will live forever", with the IIc as the "final transmutation" of the Apple II series because it was about as small as a computer with a full-sized keyboard and 5 1/4" drive could be. The magazine said in December 1984 that the IIe and IIc were the best home computers with prices above $500, with the IIc better for those using word processing and business software.

Specifications
Microprocessor
65C02 running at 1.023 MHz
8-bit data bus
Memory
128 KB RAM built-in
32 KB ROM built-in (16 KB ROM in original)
Expandable from 128 KB to 1 MB (only through non-conventional methods in original)
Video
40 and 80 columns text, with 24 lines
Low-Resolution: 40 × 48 (16 colors)
High-Resolution: 280 × 192 (6 colors)
Double-Low-Resolution: 80 × 48 (16 colors)
Double-High-Resolution: 560 × 192 (16 colors)
Audio
Built-in speaker; 1-bit toggling
User-adjustable volume (manual dial control)
Built-in storage
Slim-line internal 5.25-inch floppy drive (140 KB, single-sided)
Internal connectors
Memory Expansion Card connector (34-pin)*

* Only available on ROM 3 motherboard and higher; original IIc: NONE

Specialized chip controllers
IWM (Integrated Woz Machine) for floppy drives
Dual 6551 ACIA chips for serial I/O
External connectors
Joystick/Mouse (DE-9)
Printer, serial-1 (DIN-5)
Modem, serial-2 (DIN-5)
Video Expansion Port (D-15)
Floppy drive SmartPort (D-19)
15-Volt DC connector input (DIN-7, male)
NTSC composite video output (RCA connector)
Audio-out (-inch mono phone jack)

Revisions
The Apple IIc was in production from April 1984 to August 1988, and during this time accrued some minor changes. These modifications included three new ROM updates, a bug-fix correction to the original motherboard, a newly revised motherboard, and a slight cosmetic change to the external appearance of the machine. The ROM revision for a specific Apple IIc is determined by entering the Applesoft BASIC programming language and typing in the command  which returns the value indicating the particular ROM version.

Original IIc (ROM version '255')
The initial ROM, installed in machines produced during the first year and a half of production, was 16 KB in size. The only device which could be connected to the disk port was (one) external 5.25-inch floppy drive; software could be booted from this external drive by typing the command . The serial port did not mask incoming linefeed characters or support the XON/XOFF protocol, unlike all later firmware revisions to come. There was no self-test diagnostic present in this ROM; holding down the  key during cold boot merely cycled unusual patterns on screen which served no useful purpose or indication of the machine's health.

Serial port timing fix
The original Apple IIc motherboard (manufactured between April and November 1984) derived the timing for its two serial ports through a 74LS161 TTL logic chip. It was later found that this method's timing was 3% slower than the minimum requirement specified and caused some third-party (i.e. non-Apple) modems and printers, which operated at 1200 bits per second (baud) or faster, to function improperly. Slower serial devices operating at 300 baud or less were unaffected, as well as some faster devices which could tolerate the deviation. The solution to ensure all devices were compatible was to replace the TTL chip with an oscillator during manufacture. Apple would swap affected motherboards for users who could prove they had an incompatible serial device (e.g. a third-party 1200-baud modem which presented problems; not all did). It is important to note the problem did not affect all owners; it was more or less a hit-or-miss issue depending on the specific device connected.

UniDisk 3.5 support (ROM version '0')
This update, introduced in November 1985, came in the form of an upgrade to the ROM firmware which doubled in size from 16 KB to 32 KB. The new ROM supported "intelligent" devices such as the Apple UniDisk 3.5-inch (800 KB) floppy drive and Smartport-based hardisks, in addition to an external 5.25-inch floppy drive. A new self-test diagnostic was provided for testing built-in RAM and other signs of logic faults. The Mini-Assembler, absent since the days of the Apple II Plus, made a return, and new Monitor "Step" and "Trace" commands were added as well. The upgraded ROM added rudimentary support for an external AppleTalk networking device which was yet to be developed. When attempting to boot virtual slot 7, users would encounter the message "APPLETALK OFFLINE". The IIc, however, had no built-in networking capabilities, and no external device was ever released. The upgrade consisted of a single chip swap (and a trivial motherboard modification), which Apple provided free only to persons who purchased a UniDisk 3.5 drive. A small sticker with an icon of a 3.5-inch floppy diskette was placed next to the existing 5.25-inch diskette icon above the floppy drive port indicating the machine had been upgraded.

Memory Expansion IIc (ROM version '3')
Introduced in September 1986 simultaneously with the Apple IIGS, this model introduced a new motherboard, new keyboard and new color scheme. The original Apple IIc had no expansion options and required third-party cards (e. Legend Industries) to perform various hardware tricks. This could be done by removing the CPU and MMU chips and inserting a special board into these sockets, which then used bank switching to expand memory up to 1 Megabyte (RAM). This was similar to the function of the slots in the original Apple II, II+ as well as the auxiliary slot in the Apple IIe. The new motherboard added a 34-pin socket for plugging in memory cards directly, which allowed for the addressing of up to 1 megabyte (MB) of memory using Slinky-type memory cards. The onboard chip count was reduced from 16 memory chips (64K×1) to four (64K×4). The new firmware removed the code for the cancelled AppleTalk networking device and replaced it with support for memory cards. Bumping out the non-supported AppleTalk functionality, memory now lived in virtual slot 4, and mouse support moved to slot 7. The new keyboard no longer had the rubber anti-spill mat and offered  generally more tactile and responsive keys that felt more "clicky". At the same time, the color of the keyboard, floppy drive latch, and power supply cords changed from beige to light grey, which matched the new Platinum color scheme of the Apple IIGS. The case style, however, remained Snow White. Owners of the previous IIc model were entitled to a free motherboard upgrade if they purchased one of Apple's IIc memory expansion boards (they did not receive the new keyboard or the cosmetic changes).

Memory Expansion fix (ROM version '4')
In January 1988, a new ROM firmware update was issued to address bugs in the new memory-expandable IIc. Changes included better detection of installed RAM chips, correction of a problem when using the serial modem port in terminal mode, and a bug fix for keyboard buffering. The ROM upgrade was available free of charge only to owners of the memory expansion IIc. This was the final change to the Apple IIc; it would be superseded that September by the Apple IIc Plus (identified as ROM version '5').

International versions
Like the Apple IIe before it, the Apple IIc keyboard differed depending on what region of the world it was sold in. Sometimes the differences were very minor, such as extra local language characters and symbols printed on certain keycaps (e.g. French accented characters on the Canadian IIc such as "à", "é", "ç", etc., or the British Pound "£" symbol on the UK IIc) while other times the layout and shape of keys greatly differed (e.g. European IIcs). In order to access the local character set, the "Keyboard" switch above the keyboard was depressed, which would instantly switch text video from the US character set to the local set. The DVORAK keyboard layout was not available on international IIcs—the feature had been intended to switch between international keyboards; the DVORAK layout was merely added to give the switch a function on US IIcs.  In some countries these localized IIcs also supported 50 Hz PAL video and the different 220/240-volt power of that region by means of a different external power supply — this was a very simple change, since the IIc had an internal 12-volt power converter. The international versions replaced any English legends printed on the case (specifically the "keyboard" toggle switch, "Power" and "Disk Use" drive-activity labels) with graphical icons that could be universally understood.

Add-on accessories

Portability enhancements

At the time of the Apple IIc's release, Apple announced an optional black and white (1-bit) LCD screen designed specifically for the machine called the Apple Flat Panel Display. While it was welcomed as a means of making the IIc more portable, it did not integrate well as a portable solution, not attaching in a secure or permanent manner and not able to fold-over face down. Instead, it sat atop the machine and connected via ribbon cable to a somewhat bulky rear port connector. Its main shortcoming was that it suffered from a very poor contrast and no backlighting, making it very difficult to view without a strong external light source. The display itself had an odd aspect ratio as well, making graphics look vertically squashed. A third-party company would later introduce a work-alike LCD screen called the C-Vue, which looked and functioned very much like Apple's product, albeit with a reportedly slight improvement in viewability. Consequently, both sold poorly and had a very short market life span, making these displays fairly uncommon (and as a result, extremely rare today).

Third parties also offered external rechargeable battery units for the Apple IIc (e.g. Prairie Power Portable System available from Roger Coats) with up to eight hours per charge or longer. Although they aided in making the machine more of a true portable, they were nonetheless bulky and heavy, and added more pieces that would have to be carried. Adapter cables were sold as well that allowed the Apple IIc to plug into an automobile's DC power cigarette lighter.

To help transport the Apple IIc and its accessory pieces around, Apple sold a nylon carrying case with shoulder strap that had a compartment for the computer, its external power supply, and the cables. It had enough room to squeeze in one of the above-mentioned LCD display units. The case was grey in color with a stitched-on Apple logo in the upper right corner.

Expansion capabilities
While the Apple IIc had many built-in features to offer, many users wanted to extend the machine's capabilities beyond what Apple provided. It proved difficult since the IIc was a closed system that initially was designed with no expansion capabilities in mind; however, many companies figured out ingenious ways of squeezing enhancements inside the tiny case. Real-time clocks, memory expansion, and coprocessors were popular, and some companies even managed to combine all three into a single add-on board. Typically, in order to add these options, key chips on the motherboard were pulled and moved onto the expansion board offering the new features, and the board was then placed into the empty sockets. While sometimes a tight squeeze, this trickery worked quite well, and most importantly of all offered users a way to expand memory—something Apple did not themselves support until the Memory Expansion IIc model was introduced.

Some companies devised a method for squeezing in an entire CPU accelerator product, by means of placing all the specialized circuitry (i.e. cache and logic) into one tall chip that outright replaced the 40-pin 65C02 microprocessor, speeding up the machine from 4–10 MHz. Notable examples are the Zip Chip and Rocket Chip.

Although the IIc lacked a SCSI or IDE interface, external hard drives were produced by third parties that connected through the floppy SmartPort as an innovative alternative connection method (e.g. ProApp, Chinook). While these specialized hard drives were relatively slow due to the nature of how data was transferred through this interface (designed primarily for floppy drives) they did allow for true mass storage. The CDrive however did mount internally and was very fast due to its direct connection to the CPU. Other innovations that used existing expansion ports led to add-on speech and music synthesis products by means of external devices that plugged into the IIc's serial ports. Three popular such devices were the Mockingboard-D, Cricket and Echo IIc. Applied Engineering offered an ever increasing and improved line of "Z-Ram" internal memory expansion boards, which also included a Z-80 CPU for Apple CP/M software capability.

General accessories
For those wishing to use the Apple IIc as a standard desktop machine, Apple sold the Monitor IIc, a  monochrome CRT display with an elevated stand. The Color Monitor IIc, a  color composite monitor, followed in 1985. A mouse was another popular add-on, especially since it required no interface card, unlike earlier Apples, and simply plugged directly into the back of the machine (MousePaint, a clone of MacPaint, shipped with the IIc's mouse). An external 5.25-inch floppy drive, matching the style of the IIc, was also made available. Later, 3.5-inch floppy storage became an option with the "intelligent" UniDisk 3.5 which contained its own miniature computer inside (CPU, RAM, firmware) to overcome the issue of using a high-speed floppy drive on a 1 MHz machine.

See also
Apple II family
Apple IIc Plus
Apple IIe
Apple IIGS

Notes

References

Blechman, Fred. Apple IIc: an intelligent guide, New York : Holt, Rinehart, and Winston, 1985
DeWitt, William H. HiRes/Double HiRes graphics for the Apple IIc and Apple II family, New York: Wiley, c1986
Gilder, Jules H. Apple IIc and IIe assembly language, New York : Chapman and Hall, 1986

External links

A2Central.com  — Apple II news and downloads

Applefritter has an Apple II forum
Big Mess o' Wires - modern hardware for vintage Apple IIs
PCB pictures of the Apple II

ReactiveMicro.com — An Apple II hardware production company (cloned items)
Vintage IIc unboxing at Flickr.com — Photo series of a virgin IIc being unboxed
Apple2Online - A Free Public-Access Library of Apple II Software, Games, Photos, Documentation & more

C
Snow White design language
Computer-related introductions in 1984

fr:Apple II#Apple IIc (avril 1984)